Montcalm Simard (October 4, 1921 – January 25, 2011) was a Canadian politician in the Province of Quebec.

Background

Born in Rivière-Bleue, Quebec in the Bas-Saint-Laurent region near Maine and New Brunswick, he was the brother of politician Jean-Maurice Simard, who was a Progressive Conservative member of the Legislative Assembly of the Province of New Brunswick and Cabinet Minister from 1970 to 1985 and a member of the Senate of Canada from 1985 to 2001.

Mayor

Simard served as Mayor of Rivière-Bleue from 1957 to 1960 and from 1964 to 1975.

Member of the Provincial Legislature

He ran as a Union Nationale candidate in the 1966 election in the district of Témiscouata and won.  He was re-elected in the 1970 election, but he did not run for re-election in the 1973 election.

References

1921 births
2011 deaths
Mayors of places in Quebec
Union Nationale (Quebec) MNAs